Phonognatha is a genus of South Pacific orb-weaver spiders first described by Eugène Simon in 1895. It was originally placed with the long-jawed orb weavers, and was moved to Araneidae in 2008.

The leaf curling spider (Phonognatha graeffei) is a common Australian spider found in urban areas as well as woodlands of the northeastern, eastern, and southern states. Phonognatha vicitra was formerly placed in the genus, but it has been shown to be a misidentification of Acusilas coccineus.

Species
 it contains four species:
Phonognatha graeffei (Keyserling, 1865) (type) – Australia
Phonognatha melania (L. Koch, 1871) – Australia
Phonognatha neocaledonica Berland, 1924 – New Caledonia
Phonognatha tanyodon Kallal & Hormiga, 2018 – Australia (Queensland, New South Wales)

References

External links

 closeup pictures showing webs as well
 Taxonomy and species list

Araneidae
Araneomorphae genera
Spiders of Asia
Spiders of Oceania
Taxa named by Eugène Simon